The Eleventh East Asia Summit was held in Vientiane, Laos on September 6–8, 2016. The East Asia Summit is an annual meeting of national leaders from the East Asian region and adjoining countries.

Attending delegations
The heads of state and heads of government of the eighteen countries participated in the summit.

Agenda

References

2016 conferences
2016 in international relations
21st-century diplomatic conferences (Asia-Pacific)
ASEAN meetings
2016 in Laos
21st century in Vientiane
September 2016 events in Asia